It's a Beautiful Feeling is an EP by hardcore punk band Rich Kids on LSD, released in 1984. It was produced by Doug Moody at Mystic Studios in Hollywood. It has been described as "Great" and a "hardcore gem" and has been noted for the metal-influenced guitar work.

Track listing

Personnel
Jason Sears - Vocals
Chris Rest - Guitar
Vince Peppars - Bass
Bomer Manzullo - Drums

References

Rich Kids on LSD albums
1984 EPs